The prime minister of Norway (which directly translates to "minister of state") is the head of government and chief executive of Norway. The prime minister and Cabinet (consisting of all the most senior government department heads) are collectively accountable for their policies and actions to the monarch, to the Storting (Parliament of Norway), to their political party, and ultimately the electorate.  In practice, since it is nearly impossible for a government to stay in office against the will of the Storting, the prime minister is primarily answerable to the Storting. The prime minister is almost always the leader of the majority party in the Storting, or the leader of the senior partner in the governing coalition.

Norway has a constitution, which was adopted on 17 May 1814. The position of prime minister is the result of legislation. Modern prime ministers have few statutory powers, but provided they can command the support of their parliamentary party, they can control both the legislature and the executive (the cabinet) and hence wield considerable de facto powers.  the prime minister of Norway is Jonas Gahr Støre, of the Labour Party, replacing Erna Solberg of Conservative Party, who resigned in October 2021.

Unlike their counterparts in the rest of Europe, Norwegian prime ministers do not have the option of advising the king to dissolve the Storting and call a snap election. The constitution requires that the Storting serve out its full four-year term. If the prime minister loses the confidence of the Storting, they must resign.

See also
 List of heads of government of Norway
 Regjeringskvartalet

References

External links
Government Official Homepage

 
1873 establishments in Norway